Pierre Antoine François Huber (December 20, 1775 in Sankt Wendel – April 26, 1832 in Paris) was a brigadier general in the French army.

Huber began his career in the French Revolutionary Army on August 13, 1793 in the First Regiment de Chasseurs-à-Cheval. On March 11, 1813 he was appointed Colonel, and August 15 of the same year Baron of the Empire. On March 15, 1814  Napoleon appointed him to the command of the First Regiment de Chasseurs-à-Cheval with the rank of brigadier general.

Upon his return from Elba Napoleon gave him the command of the first brigade of cavalry of the 2nd  corps of the Army of the North. After the Napoleonic wars Huber was appointed Inspector General of Cavalry on June 16, 1819. He resigned from public office on December 17, 1826.

Honors
Order of Saint Louis
July 13, 1823 "Grand Officier" of the Legion of Honour
November 23, 1823 Spanish Order of St. Ferdinand
Huber's name is inscribed on the Arc de Triomphe in Paris in column 34

Footnotes

1775 births
1832 deaths
French commanders of the Napoleonic Wars
Names inscribed under the Arc de Triomphe
People from Sankt Wendel (district)
French military personnel of the French Revolutionary Wars
Military personnel from Saarland